Caroline Imoberdorf (born 12 January 1972) is a former synchronized swimmer from Switzerland.

References 

1972 births
Living people
Swiss synchronized swimmers
Olympic synchronized swimmers of Switzerland
Synchronized swimmers at the 1992 Summer Olympics